Wischhafen (low German Wischhoben) is a municipality in the district of Stade, in Lower Saxony, Germany.

History
It belonged to the Prince-Archbishopric of Bremen. In 1648 the Prince-Archbishopric was transformed into the Duchy of Bremen, which was first ruled in personal union by the Swedish and from 1715 on by the Hanoverian Crown. In 1823 the Duchy was abolished and its territory became part of the Stade Region.

Geography
In the north of Wischhafen is the Elbe river. In the East is the South Elbe River. In the South of Wischhafen is the village Drochtersen. In the north are the two villages Freiburg and Oederquart.

Parts of the municipality
Wischhafen has the following parts:
 Hamelwörden
 Wischhafen
 Neuland
 Wolfsbruchermoor
 Neulandermoor
 Hamelwördenermoor.

Literature
 Hartmut Reichert u. a.: Chronik der Gemeinde Wischhafen, Stade 2001
 Hamelwörden. In: Heinrich Schmidt-Barrien: Aus meinen Jungensjahren. Uthlede, Hamelwörden und Barrien. 1902–1917. Heide 1992, Seite 26-127;

References

External links
 
 Homepage of the municipality Wischhafen

Municipalities in Lower Saxony
Stade (district)